The Roman Catholic Diocese of Osorno (in Latin:  Dioecesis Osornensis ) is a suffragan diocese of the archdiocese of Puerto Montt, in Chile. The diocese was established on 15 November 1955 by Pope Pius XII by means of the papal bull Christianorum qui in Diocesibus.

Diocesan statistics

The diocese, which comprises the entire province of Osorno in the Los Lagos region of Chile, covers a territory of 9,236 km² and has 22 parishes. According to the 2002 census by the Chilean Instituto Nacional de Estadística, 69.3% of the diocesan population of Osorno, ages 15 and over, considered themselves as Catholic. This figure represents about 154,000 Catholics out of a total population of 221,509 (2002).

The mother church of the diocese is the Cathedral of San Mateo in the city of Osorno.

Bishops of Osorno

 Francisco Valdés Subercaseaux, O.F.M. Cap. † (20 June 1956 – 4 January 1982, died) 
 Miguel Caviedes Medina (8 November 1982 – 19 February 1994, appointed bishop of Los Angeles) 
 Alejandro Goic Karmelic (27 October 1994 – 10 July 2003, appointed coadjutor bishop of Rancagua). Mgr. Goic is the current president of the Chilean Conference of Catholic Bishops.
 René Osvaldo Rebolledo Salinas, former Vicar General of Villarrica (8 May 2004 - 14 December 2013, appointed Archbishop of La Serena)
 Juan Barros Madrid (March 2015 – 11 June 2018, resigned)
Jorge Enrique Concha Cayuqueo, O.F.M. (6 February 2020 -)

Parishes

City of Osorno and its surroundings:

 San Mateo Apóstol, Cathedral (1792) 
 Nuestra Señora del Carmen (1957) 
 Sagrado Corazón (1964) 
 San Francisco (1967) 
 María Reina de los Mártires (1990) 
 Santa Rosa de Lima (2001) 
 Nuestra Señora de Lourdes (1930) 
 Jesús Obrero (1964) 
 El Buen Pastor (1972) 
 San José (1980) 
 San Leopoldo Mandic (1986)

Other localities:

 Sagrada Familia (1901), Río Negro 
 San Joaquín y Santa Ana (1910), Río Negro
 San Juan Bautista (1806), Mission (Misión) of San Juan de la Costa 
 Cristo Resucitado (1975), Mission of Cuinco (San Juan de la Costa) 
 San Bernardino (1794), Mission of Quilacahuín (San Pablo) 
 Nuestra Señora de la Candelaria (1836), San Pablo 
 San Agustín (1904), Puerto Octay 
 San Juan Nepomuceno (1909), Cancura (Osorno) 
 San Sebastián (1944), Purranque 
 Nuestra Señora de Fátima (1955), Entre Lagos (Puyehue) 
 San Pedro Apóstol (1970), Rupanco (Puyehue)

External links
Website of the diocese (in Spanish)
Diocese of Osorno at the www.catholic-hierarchy.org website

Osorno
Osorno
Osorno
Orsono, Roman Catholic Diocese of
1955 establishments in Chile